Ren'ai CHU! is a Japanese erotic game released by Saga Planets in 2001. A non-hentai disc of bonus extras called "Motto Love-CHU!" was released in the same year, and the Dreamcast version, Renai Chu! Happy Perfect, released by GN Software in 2003.

It is well known for its theme song, of the same name as the game. Two Para Para remix versions are contained on the fun disc, and also the original and another vocal edition exist.

Characters
Nanami Kanzaki
Miduki Saeki
Rei Sudo
Karin Tsukishima
Nonoka Tsukishima - Karin's sister
Wakana Higuchi
Lime Regan
Yayoi Nishina
Taiyou Kawasaki
Hikaru Ijuin

External links
Saga Planets
GN Software

2001 video games
Eroge
Dreamcast games
Japan-exclusive video games
Video games developed in Japan
Windows games